The Latécoère 28 was a successful French long-haul mail plane and passenger airliner of the 1930s. It was the main-stay of Air France's predecessor, Aéropostale in its efforts to establish intercontinental air mail services and support French colonialism  and French cultural influence between the wars.

Its pilots included famous poets and French men of letters such as Antoine de Saint Exupéry and Jean Mermoz as well as the usual veterans from World War I.

Design and development

The Latécoère 28 was a development of the Latécoère 26. It was braced high-wing single-engined monoplane initially powered by a Renault 12Jbr engine. The Latécoère 28 had a fixed tailwheel undercarriage and enclosed cockpit for two crew. The cabin was fitted for eight-passengers with access to a washroom.

A total of about fifty planes of several versions were built between 1927 and 1932. The seaplane version, the Latécoère 28-3, was the first to make a postal delivery crossing of the South Atlantic when Jean Mermoz flew from Dakar to Natal in 21 hours and a half aboard the Comte-de-La Vaulx (prototype n° 919) on 12 May 1930.  Unfortunately the plane was lost at sea during the return flight (with no loss of life, nor of mail).

This high-wing single engine plane was first built with Renault engines which were soon replaced by Hispano Suiza 12 giving 500 hp (370 kW). The floatplane version had the Hispano Suiza 12Lbr giving 650 hp (480 kW).

Operational service
The first aircraft were used by Aéropostale on the African mail routes connecting Casablanca and Dakar. The aircraft also inaugurated a Paris-Madrid service.
It became famous in South America because of the regular mail service it ensured, from France to Argentina, and further on. With this plane it was possible to send a letter from Paris to Santiago de Chile in what seemed then like an astonishingly short four days. Previously, the mail steamships had taken weeks or months.

It had a very limited military career. Venezuela bought three for use as bombers, and the government of France gave several to the republican side in the Spanish Civil War.

Variants
Laté 28.0
Initial production with a  Renault 12Jbr engine, 17 built (some later converted to 28.1).
Laté 28.1
Further production with a  Hispano-Suiza 12Hbxr engine, 29 built.
Laté 28.2
Mail carrier, one built (n°948).
Laté 28.3
Mail carrier float-plane, five built. Three entered service with Air-France under the erroneous designation Latécoère 28.1/H
Laté 28.3/H
A wheeled landing gear version of the 28.3, one built.
Laté 28.3-I
A passenger version of the 28.3, powered by a  Gnome et Rhône 14Kb Mistral Major radial engine, one built.
Laté 28.4-I
A development of the 28.3 with a  Hispano-Suiza 12Nbr engine, one built
Laté 28.5
Structurally strengthened version with a  Hispano-Suiza 12Nbr engine.
Laté 28.6
For Venezuela powered by a   Hispano-Suiza 12Nbr engine, three built.
Laté 28.8
One 28.0 modified with an enlarged wingspan
Laté 28.9
Three-seat landplane bomber for Venezuela, three built.

Operators

Civil
 
 Aeropostala Argentina
 
 Aéropostale
 Air France
 
 Aviacon Aeropostal Venezolana
 Linea Aeropostal Venezolana

Military

 Spanish Republican Air Force
 
 Venezuelan Air Force

Specifications (Latécoère 28.0)

See also

References

External links 

 Latécoère 28

1920s French airliners
1920s French mailplanes
2
Single-engined tractor aircraft
High-wing aircraft
Aircraft first flown in 1927